The Beginning of the End of the World is a compilation album by Brazilian post-punk band Mercenárias, released in 2005 by British record label Soul Jazz Records. It features a selection of tracks of their two studio albums, Cadê as Armas? (1986) and Trashland (1988).

The album's name alludes to the Brazilian music festival O Começo do Fim do Mundo, that happened in 1982 and promoted many underground punk bands such as Ratos de Porão, Inocentes and Cólera, among others.

External links
 Page for the album at Soul Jazz's official website

2005 compilation albums
Mercenárias albums
Compilation albums by Brazilian artists
Post-punk compilation albums
Portuguese-language compilation albums
Soul Jazz Records compilation albums